The discography of American group Jonas Brothers consists of five studio albums, three live albums, three soundtrack albums, one compilation album, one video album, three extended plays, and 30 singles (including four as a featured artist).

On August 8, 2006, the Jonas Brothers released their debut studio album, It's About Time. The album reached number 91 on the Billboard 200.
 
On August 7, 2007, the Jonas Brothers released their self-titled second studio album. The album reached number five on the Billboard 200. It produced the top-20 single, "S.O.S", which reached number 17 on the Billboard Hot 100. It also produced the top-40 singles, "Year 3000" and "When You Look Me in the Eyes", which reached numbers 31 and 25 on the Hot 100, respectively. Later that year, they released the single "Play My Music", which charted at number 20 on the Hot 100.
 
On August 12, 2008, the Jonas Brothers released their third studio album, A Little Bit Longer. The album debuted and peaked atop the Billboard 200, giving them their first chart-topping project. It produced the top-10 singles, "Burnin' Up" and "Tonight", which reached numbers five and eight on the Billboard Hot 100, respectively. It also produced the top-20 promotional singles, the albums title track and "Pushin' Me Away", which reached numbers 11 and 16 on the Hot 100, respectively.
 
On June 16, 2009, the Jonas Brothers released their fourth studio album, Lines, Vines and Trying Times. The album debuted and peaked atop the Billboard 200, giving them their second chart-topping project. It produced the top-40 single, "Paranoid", which reached number 37 on the Billboard Hot 100. However, the group went on hiatus sometime in 2013. Later that year, they released a collaboration with Miley Cyrus, Demi Lovato, and Selena Gomez, "Send It On", as a promotional single, which reached number 20 on the Hot 100.
 
On June 7, 2019, the Jonas Brothers released their fifth studio album, Happiness Begins, as their comeback album. It produced the Billboard Hot 100 number-one single, "Sucker", which was the first single that the group released after their hiatus ended. It also produced the top-20 single, "Only Human", which reached number 18 on the Hot 100, as well as the top-40 single, "Cool", which reached number 27 on the Hot 100. In 2020, the Jonas Brothers released the single "What a Man Gotta Do", which debuted and peaked at number 16 on the Hot 100. That same year, they released the single "X", which features Karol G and debuted and peaked at number 33 on the Hot 100. In 2021, the Jonas Brothers released a collaboration with Marshmello, "Leave Before You Love Me", which reached number 19 on the Hot 100.

Albums

Studio albums

Live albums

Soundtrack albums

Compilation albums

Video albums

Extended plays

Miscellaneous

Streaming-exclusive compilations

Singles

As lead artists

As featured artists

Promotional singles

Other charted songs

Other appearances

Music videos

Notes

References

External links
 Official site
 Music on MySpace
 Music on YouTube
 RIAA Certification Database

Discography
Discographies of American artists
Pop music group discographies